Altsek Nunatak (Nunatak Altsek \'nu-na-tak al-'tsek\) is a  rocky hill projecting from the Murgash Glacier in Dryanovo Heights on Greenwich Island, Antarctica.  The peak is named after Khan Altsek, whose Bulgars settled in Italy in the 7th century AD.

Location

See also
 Dryanovo Heights

Maps

 L.L. Ivanov et al. Antarctica: Livingston Island and Greenwich Island, South Shetland Islands. Scale 1:100000 topographic map. Sofia: Antarctic Place-names Commission of Bulgaria, 2005.
 L.L. Ivanov. Antarctica: Livingston Island and Greenwich, Robert, Snow and Smith Islands. Scale 1:120000 topographic map.  Troyan: Manfred Wörner Foundation, 2009.

References
Altsek Nunatak. SCAR Composite Antarctic Gazetteer
 Bulgarian Antarctic Gazetteer. Antarctic Place-names Commission. (details in Bulgarian, basic data in English)
Reference Map

External links
 Altsek Nunatak. Copernix satellite image

Nunataks of Antarctica